Sauraseni Maitra is an Indian model and actress. Maitra started her career when she was 9 years old.

Career 
Sauraseni Maitra started her modelling career at an early age. She is an Indian actress who started off with the 2012 action drama film Chittagong, under the direction of Bedabrata Pain. She then went on to star in the 2015 comedy drama Umrika, directed by Prashant Nair, starring Aashish Bhatt and Uplaksh Kochhar in the lead roles. Her 2017 release includes the thriller movie Meghnadbodh Rohoshyo, under the direction of Anik Datta, starring in the lead role opposite Sabyasachi Chakraborty and Abir Chatterjee. Her other project includes director Pratim D. Gupta's drama movie Maacher Jhol starring Paoli Dam and Kaya Blocksage in the lead roles opposite Sauraseni.
She worked in an advertisement directed by Bengali film director Anik Dutta, in which Bollywood film actress Deepika Padukone acted as well.

Filmography

Web series

References

External links 
 

Living people
Bengali actresses
1996 births